Norman Lawson (died 25 September 2011) was an English footballer and cricketer.

Career

Football career
Lawson played as a winger, spending his early career with Hednesford Town, Bury and Swansea Town. He later played for Watford, Kettering Town and Hereford United, before becoming player-manager of both Merthyr Tydfil and Ton Pentre.

Cricket career
Lawson played club cricket for Swansea Civil Service, Sketty Church, AWCO and Sketty Quins clubs, while he was Captain of the Welsh over-50 team.

Later life and death
Lawson died on 25 September 2011, aged 75, at Hill House Hospital in Sketty.

References

1930s births
2011 deaths
English footballers
English football managers
Hednesford Town F.C. players
Bury F.C. players
Swansea City A.F.C. players
Watford F.C. players
Kettering Town F.C. players
Hereford United F.C. players
Merthyr Tydfil F.C. players
Ton Pentre F.C. players
English Football League players
Association football midfielders